Dientje Meijer-Haantjes (17 March 1918 – 5 October 1994) was a Dutch gymnast. She competed in the women's artistic team all-around event at the 1948 Summer Olympics.

References

External links
 

1918 births
1994 deaths
Dutch female artistic gymnasts
Olympic gymnasts of the Netherlands
Gymnasts at the 1948 Summer Olympics
Gymnasts from Amsterdam